A setar is a stringed instrument, a type of lute used in Persian traditional music, played solo or accompanying voice. It is a member of the tanbur family of long-necked lutes with a range of more than two and a half octaves. Originally a three stringed instrument, a fourth string was added by the mid 19th century. It is played with the index finger of the right hand.

It has been speculated that the setar originated in Persia by the 9th century C.E. A more conservative estimate says "it originated in the 15th century, or even earlier."

Although related to the tanbur, in recent centuries, the setar has evolved so that, musically, it more closely resembles the tar, both in tuning and playing style.

Etymology
According to Curt Sachs, Persians chose to name their lutes around the word tar, meaning string, combined with a word for the number of strings. Du + tar is the 2-stringed dutār, se + tar is the 3-stringed setār, čartar (4 strings), pančtār (5 strings). The modern Iranian instrument's name سه‌تار  is a combination of سه —meaning "three"—and تار —meaning "string", therefore the word gives the meaning of "three-stringed" or "tri-stringed".

In spite of the instrument's name implying it should have three strings, the modern instrument actually has four strings. One was added in the 19th century. Strings however are grouped so that musicians are still dealing with three groups or courses of strings, instead of four separately played strings.

Sharing a name
Other tanbur-family instruments share the setar name. Sharing the name may not mean a direct connection between the musical traditions.

In Tajikistan, the Pamiri Setor is larger than the Iranian setar. It has 3 playing strings and sympathetic strings (as many as 8–12). It is played with a "thimblelike metal plectrum" worn on a finger.

In Baluchistan, the setar is larger than the Iranian setar, and is a "rhythmic drone" instrument to accompany singing. Its three strings are set up to resemble the dutar's two strings: one bass string and a pair of strings tune "a 4th higher."

In Pakistan, there exists the Chitrali sitar with 5 strings in 3 courses, with melody played on the top two strings.

In Xinjiang, China, Satar (Sàtǎ'ěr) is an important instrument in 12 muqam. It is a bowed lute with 13 strings, one raised bowing string and 12 sympathetic strings, tuned to the mode of the muqam or piece being played.

In India, the Sitar is an instrument with many forms. Its name is "an Urdu transcription of the Persian sihtār". The Indian instrument was likely adapted from instruments brought by Muslim empires and then developed locally.

Construction
1. Peghead or headstock
2. Pegs
3. Fret above nut
4. Nut
5. Main Frets
6. Side Frets or Secondary Frets
7. Neck
8. Bowl
9. Sound holes
10. Bridge
11. String holder or wire holder
12. Strings

The instrument can be categorized as a neck-bowl instrument. Strings run from the pegs at the top of the neck, across a bone or plastic nut that has grooves to separate them, down the neck, across the bowl, over the bridge and are secured to a string holder at the end of the bowl. The pegs are inserted directly into the end of the instrument's neck, similar to a headstock.

The bowl is structurally similar to the bowl of the tanbur, but smaller and pear-shaped. The length of the bowl is from 26 to 30 cm, its width is between 12 and 16 cm and its depth is about 13 cm. It is usually made of mulberry or walnut wood. The structure of the bowl can be either a single piece of wood or made of separate and glued pieces. The soundboard of the bowl is made of thin sheets of wood. It has sound holes to let the sound escape the bowl. The musician's hand may be placed on it while playing. The length of the neck is 40 to 48 cm long and 3 cm wide. A 12 cm section at the top is set aside for the pegs. The neck may be decorated with camel bone, covering the neck to make it more beautiful and to extend its useful life. The wooden bridge is between 5 and 6 cm long and its height is less than 1 cm. It has shallow grooves for the strings to rest in. The strings, after passing over the bridge from the neck, are secured on the wire holder. The neck has frets made from thin threads made of animal intestines or silk. They are tied in 3 or 4 strands across the neck, and are responsible for dividing the neck into lengths, allowing the musician to find notes. There may be 26 frets, one of which is at the nut and not used to create a note.

Characteristics
The setar belongs to the tanbur family, but today it is very close to the tar, having the same neck (and same number of frets and tuning system).

The setar has a pear-shaped body, made (like those of the lute or oud) from strips of thin mulberrywood lathes, glued together into a bowl. Alternatively, the bowl could be carved from a block of wood. The bowl is approximately 25 cm long and 15 centimeters at the widest point, and 15 centimeters deep.

The neck of the instrument is long and narrow, long enough to support a 62–70 cm-long string (minus the 25 cm where the string passes over the bowl after leaving the neck). The neck has gut strings wrapped around it which function as frets, which can be positioned to change the notes that the musician will hit upon fingering at the fret. The New Grove Dictionary of Musical Instruments says that there are between 25 and 27 frets. Another source, mentions between 22 and 28 frets, placed according to the musician's ear.

The instrument is strung with four strings. From top to bottom the strings are (4) Bam or bass string, (3) drone string, (2) yellow string) and (1) silver string.

The top-two strings, referred to together by the one-string's name —bam (بم)— function together as a pair and are played together. The other two strings are known as the gold string and the silver string. The silver string is the melody string. Historically, only the (4) bam string, the (2) yellow string and the (1) silver string existed. The need for the additional fourth string was recognized centuries ago, by intellectual thinkers such as Abu Nasr al-Farabi (ca. 872-950 C.E.), Abu Ali Sina (980-1037 C.E.), Safi al-Din Ermavi (ca. 1216-1294 C.E.), and (in the 20th century) the late Abul Hassan Khan Saba.

The new string is sometimes referred to as the "fourth string" because it is the last of the four strings to be added to the instrument. However, it was inserted between the yellow string and bass string; today when looking at the modern instrument being played, it is the (3) drone string, the third string from the bottom. The newest string is also known as the Mushtaq (مشتاق) string, because it was first used by Mushtaq Ali Shah, according to a narration of Abolhassan Saba.

Playing the setar
The setar is played with the musician sitting, held at a 45-degree angle on the right thigh. Normally, the musician uses the fingers of the left hand on the frets to choose notes on the white string (bottom-most string). The right hand plays the setar, usually using only the index finger.

The instrument is played using the index finger of the right hand, using an "oscillating motion" This differentiates it from the tanburs, which are plucked with multiple fingers or with a homemade plectrum, made from plastic, quills or razor blades.

In more complicated works the musician may use the index, middle, ring and sometimes the little finger of the left hand to fret notes, and may use the thumb to pick notes on the bass strings.

Tuning the setar

The instrument is most commonly tuned c c' g c' using Helmholtz pitch notation.

The strings are tuned in multiple ways, to match a music's tonality or a singer's voice. A basic example showing one of the tuning patterns, listed in scientific pitch notation, top to bottom: C3 C4 • G3 • C4. The lowest pitch strings played together as a course (C3 C4) are the bass string (made of bronze or phosphor-bronze) and the drone (made of steel). The highest pitch strings are the "yellow" G3, made of bronze or phosphor-bronze and the "white" G3 made of steel.

Players not only tune the strings of the setar, but also move the gut or nylon frets that are tied around the neck, between the neck and the strings. Since these frets are moveable, players can move them to set notes closer or farther apart. The instrument is designed to play microtones, pitches between the standard western pitches on the piano keyboard. A Koron lowers and a Sori raises the pitches by quarter steps (flats and sharps are half-steps).

Setting strings for a Dastgâh

Strings are tuned to meet the tonal requirements of Dastgâh.

The instrument's four strings are not always set the same. Tones are not absolutes (unless playing with instruments that are set, such as a western-instruments with standardized and unchangeable pitches). Rather, the strings are intervals, what one string sounds like when compared to the first string.

Setting the frets

The table below can be used to position the frets on the instrument's neck; the frets are made of tied string and are moveable. The instrument used to create the measurements had a scale length of 66 centimeters, from nut at the top to bridge at the bottom.

The table contains the names and playable samples of notes, for a string set to C. The instrument has microtones; in western music the musical scale is made of tones and half-tones. In Persian music, there can be quarter tones as well, marked koron or sori. These are quarter tones. Koron is 1/4 step flat. Sori is 1/4 step sharp. For example, in the photo there is an E4, E4 flat, and between the two an E4 koron. Between the F4 and the F4 sharp is the F4 sori.

The setar in recorded media 
The setar was first recorded for His Master's Voice in the winter of 1888-1889 (1306 AH) by Arthur James Twain. He recorded singer Batool Rezaei  (stage name: Banoo Machol Parvaneh, mother of Khatereh Parvaneh) playing setar, accompanied by Habibollah Samaei on santur, Ghavam Al-Sultan on tar and Agha Mehdi Navai on ney. Joey Walker of Australian psychedelic rock band King Gizzard and the Lizard Wizard played Setar in various songs, primarily on the album Nonagon Infinity.

Notable setarists

 Mirza Abdollah
 Hossein Alizadeh
 Ahmad Ebadi
 Sa'id Hormozi
 Kayhan Kalhor
 Mohammad-Reza Lotfi
 Hamid Motebassem 
 Abolhasan Saba
 Dariush Safvat
 Dariush Talai
 Jalal Zolfonun

See also

Music of Iran
Barbat (lute)
Bağlama
Sitar
Sataer

Notes

References

External links 
How to tune a setar, tuning patterns for 12 dastgahs.
Video. Setar solo by Kayhan Kalhor in the  Abgineh Museum, Tehran, 21 May 2020.
Radif played my Sa'im Hormozi. Has clips of his instrument playing in different dastgah tunings.

Necked bowl lutes
Azerbaijani musical instruments
Iranian inventions
Persian musical instruments